Darroll is a masculine given name and may refer to:

Darroll DeLaPorte (1903–1980), American football player
Darroll Powe (born 1985), Canadian ice hockey player
Darroll Wilson (born 1966), American boxer

See also
Darell 
Darrell
Darryl
Durrell

Masculine given names
English-language masculine given names